Matthew "Matt" Murdock is a fictional character primarily portrayed by Charlie Cox in the Marvel Cinematic Universe (MCU) media franchise, based on the Marvel Comics character of the same name—commonly known by his alias, Daredevil or The Devil of Hell's Kitchen. In the MCU, Murdock is a lawyer by day who specializes in legal defense alongside his colleagues Foggy Nelson and Karen Page, while also aiding other superpowered individuals within New York City. He further pursues a personal crusade to inflict his own brand of justice at night, masquerading as a masked vigilante hoping to remove the corruption facing Hell's Kitchen following the Battle of New York from The Avengers (2012). Murdock is blind, which with training enabled him to develop his other senses to superhuman levels. His activities would eventually bring him into conflict with enemies such as businessman Wilson Fisk and the Hand organization in the process, the latter of which he combatted alongside the Defenders when they successfully resurrected and weaponized a former ally and lover from his past, Elektra Natchios. Following Fisk's defeat, Murdock returns to his law practice, successfully defending Peter Parker against criminal charges pressed against him for the murder of Mysterio, as well as apprehending the vigilante Leap-Frog with the assistance of fellow superhuman lawyer Jennifer Walters, who he subsequently enters a romantic relationship with.

In addition to Parker and Walters, he would also come to the defense of and befriend other heroes, namely Jessica Jones, Luke Cage, Danny Rand, and Frank Castle, among other acquaintances.

, the character has appeared in the Marvel Television series Daredevil (2015–2018), the miniseries The Defenders (2017), the Marvel Studios film Spider-Man: No Way Home (2021) and the Disney+ television series She-Hulk: Attorney at Law (2022). Future appearances include Echo (2023) and Daredevil: Born Again (2024). An alternate version of the character is set to appear in the animated series Spider-Man: Freshman Year (2024), with Cox reprising the role.

Cox's portrayal received significant praise critically and from fans, with the "#SaveDaredevil" campaign and petition being launched for his return after Daredevil cancellation in 2018, which Cox attributed in October 2022 as having been responsible for his return to the role.

Concept and creation 

The character Daredevil made his first appearance in his own self-titled issue, Daredevil #1 (April 1964), written by Stan Lee and art by Bill Everett with unspecified input provided by Jack Kirby, who devised Daredevil's billy club.

In 2013, Marvel Television and Disney announced that they would provide Netflix with television series centered around Daredevil, Jessica Jones, Luke Cage, Iron Fist, leading to the Defenders crossover miniseries. In May 2014, Charlie Cox was announced to portray Murdock, with Steven DeKnight being brought in to be the showrunner of the first season.

Casting 
The idea of casting Cox as Daredevil came from Marvel's chief creative officer Joe Quesada in 2012, before Marvel Studios gained the rights to the character from 20th Century Fox. Cox wanted to be involved with the series after reading the first two scripts for Daredevil (2015), telling his agent "These are two of the best TV scripts I've read". Skylar Gaertner portrays a young Murdock in Daredevil.

Cox later explained that, unlike the Marvel comic book character, his version of Daredevil would not be a "man without fear", saying "Someone who does not have fear – literally does not experience fear – is not that interesting. The way I like to think about it is that he is a man with fear, but he on a daily basis decides to confront that fear and to overcome it. So the title of 'the man without fear' is almost a title that the public in his world gives him just because of what he does. But inside himself, he's very afraid at times. And he finds a way to confront those fears and punch through it." Cox "had to do a lot of gym work" to change his physique to equal that of the more muscular character as drawn in the comics.

Series cancellation and revival 
In November 2018, Netflix cancelled the series after three seasons. Though the seasons would remain to stream on the service, the character would "live on in future projects for Marvel". Cox was saddened by the cancellation, since it "felt like we had a lot of stories to tell", especially since he had been excited by what had been discussed for a potential fourth season, adding that he was hopeful for an opportunity to portray the character again. Following the series' cancellation, fans launched a petition to revive the series with the "SaveDaredevil" hashtag. The petition amassed over 300,000 signatures.

In June 2020, Cox was unexpectedly contacted by Marvel Studios president Kevin Feige about reprising his role as Matt Murdock in the Marvel Cinematic Universe (MCU) projects Spider-Man: No Way Home and She-Hulk: Attorney at Law. Cox's return to the role was confirmed by Feige in December 2021.  Jessica Henwick, who co-stars with Cox as Colleen Wing in The Defenders, indicated that he had known about the opportunity to reprise the role in a Marvel Studios production years prior. The writers of She-Hulk initially believed they would not have been able to feature the character in the series, and were eventually told by the studio that they were able to use the character. In October 2022, Cox explained that he approached Marvel Studios' Daredevil as the same character from the Netflix series, saying it "should be and is always", and Murdock changed to fit tonally, attributing his MCU return to the "#SaveDaredevil" campaign and petition later that month.

Design 

Murdock's suits are differentiated more by texture than color, with a limited palette, "Because, obviously, he can't see his colors, but he has to know anything he chooses is going to coordinate with one another". Cox's size changed throughout the series as he continued to work out. Murdock begins the first season wearing a black costume (called the "vigilante outfit" by production), inspired by the one worn by the character in Frank Miller's The Man Without Fear, rather than the more traditional red, horned suit. This was done to highlight the formation of Matt Murdock as Daredevil, with the costume evolving over time as the character develops. Quesada conceptualized the look based on DeKnight's specifications.

Maslansky noted that they wanted the outfit to "look like something that Matt Murdock could put together himself, that he could either order off the Internet or shop around town. ... I went to army/navy stores. I went online. I looked at athletic clothing, compression clothing, military stuff and construction stuff....we wound up with pretty practical choices for him. His shirts are compression shirts and his pants wound up being from an army/navy store". Concerning the black mask, Maslansky noted that a balance between aesthetic and safety was required, and that "It's made out of a cotton mesh. Layers and layers of it. It has to really conform to his head, but at the same time, he had to be able to see through it."

On the red suit that Murdock gets at the end of the first season, Maslansky said, "We wanted something that looked militaristic and functional, but also dramatic and sexy" adding that it was "tricky" making it practical. To begin the process of creating the suit, Quesada contacted Ryan Meinerding and the costume artists and design team at Marvel Studios, who all contributed design ideas, with one of Meinerding's ultimately being picked. Quesada, who previously worked as an artist on Daredevil comics, gave several suggestions, including the use of rivets and "architectural" shapes as a reference to the creation of New York City. The suit is intended to look like a Kevlar vest, and the black sections are an homage to comic panels where the artists highlighted certain areas with red, with "deeper portions" in shadow. On the mask, Meinerding noted the difficulty in designing the entire top half of a face that is intended to match the bottom half of an actor's face, "because half of his face has to be covered and has its own expression and the actor's face is going to be doing something else".

Evolution into Daredevil 
Talking about why the traditional "DD" does not appear on Murdock's red suit, and other difficulties with adapting the suit to live action, DeKnight explained that "he got the suit before he got the name. We talked a lot about DD on the suit, which is one of the more problematic emblems in superhero-dom. It's a little wonky. His suit in the comics is very difficult to translate to screen, especially in this world that is grounded and gritty. There are some practical difficulties. The Daredevil outfit in the comics, his mask only covers half his nose. It doesn't come all the way down to the tip. We discovered when we were trying to design it that if you didn't bring it all the way down, you could clearly tell it was Charlie. Not only did we have the suspension of belief that nobody would know "hey, that's Matt Murdock" we also had the practical problem of it becoming almost impossible when it came to switching in and out our stunt double. So we had to make that adjustment".

In She-Hulk: Attorney at Law, Daredevil's costume is similar to the red one he wore in the Netflix series, but with an updated color scheme to include the yellow helmet and accents from the character's debut comics design in Daredevil #1. Marvel Studios had clear intentions as to what his costume would look like for the series.

Characterization 
DeKnight has explained that Murdock is "not super strong. He's not invulnerable... he just has senses that are better than a normal human's". On the character's "grey" morals, he noted, "He's a lawyer by day, and he's taken this oath. But every night he breaks that oath, and goes out and does very violent things". The character's Catholicism plays a large role in the series, with DeKnight calling him "one of the most, if not the most, religious characters in the Marvel Universe". Cox, who was raised Catholic, found that helpful, saying, "You grow up steeped in that. If you're in church, standing in front of the altar, you sort of automatically know how to respond. It all kicks in – you genuflect, you sit in the pew. I didn't have to pretend any of that". On how the name Daredevil is revealed in the series, DeKnight explained that "We talked about, do we do one of the versions in the comics where when he was a kid people used to taunt him with the name Daredevil, but that didn't quite feel like our world. At one point we were going to have Ben Urich (Vondie Curtis-Hall) give him the name, but the timing wasn't right from where he's in his black outfit and then gets his suit, which is after Ben's untimely demise. The solution was to play that off-screen and then hit it in the paper that he's been given this name Daredevil".

On portraying the character, Cox said, "There are so many aspects. There's the blindness and physicality. Making a show is about human emotion, conflict and turmoil. When meeting a man who's a lawyer by day and believes in law and justice and then a man by night is someone who takes the law into his own hands. He deals with battles dealing with that concept". Elaborating on the difficulties of playing the character, Cox said, "I put on a shirt but I can't look where the buttons are, because Daredevil wouldn't know where the buttons are, but I also can't fumble".

Cox worked with blind consultant Joe Strechay, and was conscious of what his eyes were doing at all times, to ensure they would not look at or react to something unlike a blind person. For The Defenders, Cox felt the second season—in which Murdock fought alongside Elektra Natchios and the Punisher– prepared the character to accept help in the series, and that moving into the miniseries the death of Natchios would be weighing heavily on Murdock. Ramirez likened Murdock and Natchios' relationship to a more overtly sexual version of Edward Norton and Brad Pitt's characters in Fight Club (1999), with Natchios being Murdock's "burden to deal with" after she is resurrected.

The ending of The Defenders implied elements of the third season would be inspired by the "Born Again" story arc, with Cox being excited to adapt "Born Again", calling it an "amazing story" and that the implications of the story on the season would be " exciting". Season three showrunner Erik Oleson drew inspiration from both "Born Again" and "Guardian Devil" for the tone of the season, structurally building the season if any viewer was a "devout Catholic... you could read into the events of the early episodes as a message from God to Matt" and noting that Murdock would "broken physically, broken emotionally, and broken spiritually" with his heightened senses failing him, adding that Murdock is "angry at God, angry at the fact he had risked his life to do God's work, and he's questioning whether or not he was a fool." This results in Murdock donning the black suit from season one, since he goes to "pretty much the darkest place you can" and is at a point where he's "incapable of being Daredevil, [and] he would rather just end it than go forward in his life without abilities."

For the character's appearance in She-Hulk: Attorney at Law, star Tatiana Maslany called Murdock and her character Jennifer Walters best friends, while lead director Kat Coiro said the two "match each other's wits". Head writer Jessica Gao stated that they have a commonality in both being lawyers who are also superheroes. By featuring Murdock in the series, the writers were allowed to have the character "play in the tone" of the series, which is a half-hour legal comedy, and explore a "lighter side" to him from his previous darker portrayals, such as in the Netflix series.

On Murdock's appearances in Spider-Man: No Way Home and She-Hulk, Cox explained: "It should be and it is always the same character. The difference is just like with people, we morph and change and are very different based on what's going on in our lives. The Matt Murdock from the Netflix show, that world and what was going on for Matt meant that most of the time we were living with a man who had a huge amount of pressure and strain and tonally the show was very dark and gritty and heavy. I don't know what [Daredevil: Born Again] will be like, but when I came over to do Spider-Man and She-Hulk, the tone is much more lighthearted and tongue in cheek and fun and witty and full of levity, so the hope was that Matt is able to fit into that world and participate in it without it being a different character, a different person."

Appearances 

The character first appears in the Marvel Television series Daredevil and later The Defenders as a founding member of the eponymous team. The character's first appearance in a Marvel Studios project is in Spider-Man: No Way Home. He later guest stars in the She-Hulk: Attorney at Law episodes "Ribbit and Rip It" and "Whose Show Is This?". Cox will reprise his role in the television series Echo (2023) and Daredevil: Born Again.

Additionally, Cox will voice an alternate version of Daredevil in the animated series Spider-Man: Freshman Year (2024).

Fictional character biography

Early life 
Matt Murdock was born to boxer Jack Murdock and nun Maggie Grace. As a child, Murdock was blinded in a car accident, heightening his other senses, training to "see" using his senses by an elderly and blind ninja, Stick. Murdock eventually attends Columbia Law School, meeting and befriending Foggy Nelson while subsequently dating Elektra Natchios before breaking up. By 2015, Murdock and Nelson decide to open up their own law firm, Nelson and Murdock.

Becoming a vigilante 

Shortly after opening the firm, Murdock and Nelson are appointed with Union Allied employee Karen Page being framed for murder. After clearing Page, Murdock begins fighting crime to protect Hell's Kitchen from corruption facing it following the Battle of New York, donning a costume consisting of a black mask and black suit and dubbed the "Masked Man" by the media. His vigilantism brings him face-to-face with crime lord Wilson Fisk, a businessman who has interests in the city as the Kingpin.

Page and New York Bulletin reporter Ben Urich work to expose Fisk, while Murdock takes him down. During their final confrontation, Murdock wears a new red, horned, and armoured suit built by Melvin Potter and modelled after the devil before fighting Fisk, defeating him and sending him to prison. Following the arrest, news media begins naming the vigilante Daredevil, which Murdock later adopts.

Clashing with the Punisher 

About six months later, Murdock, as Daredevil, investigates the cartels, learning that all their high-power weapons have been stolen by one man. Daredevil confronts the man in a rooftop but is shot in the head, though he survives due to his body armor, Nelson insisting he rests and recover. The man is nicknamed "the Punisher" by the DA's office, who is a deadly vigilante who lost his family. Murdock, as Daredevil, captures him, whose real name is Frank Castle, but as a lawyer, represents him during The People vs. Frank Castle trial. His old girlfriend Elektra Natchios returns, having become involved against the supervillain organization The Hand, fighting alongside her and Stick.

Murdock's covert operations disrupts his ability to work on the trial and Castle is subsequently sent to Ryker's Island. Elektra, the escaped Castle, and Murdock work together to defeat the Hand, but Elektra dies in the process. On Christmas, Murdock reveals his vigilante identity to Page, and his legal partnership with Nelson dissolves due to Murdock's poor performance at the trial.

Forming the Defenders 

Months after Elektra's death, Murdock practices as a pro bono lawyer and is dispatched at Jeri Hogarth's behest to represent Jessica Jones after a man kills himself in her office. Jones continues her investigation into Midland Circle against Murdock's recommendation, and both end up reinforcing an escape attempt by Luke Cage and Danny Rand from the Hand. During the melee, Murdock fights the Black Sky, a powerful foe that he eventually recognizes as a resurrected Elektra.

Taking shelter at a restaurant, the four are joined by Stick, who explains the Hand's conflict with the Chaste and K'un L'un, and in repelling the next attack Cage also captures Hand leader Sowande, who reveals the other part of their plan; use Rand's Iron Fist to access the dragon bones at the bottom of Midland Circle. The Black Sky finds their hideout, kills Stick and captures Rand, setting up their final conflict at Midland Circle, where the Defenders choose to demolish the building on top of the Hand, whose leadership the Black Sky has adopted upon recalling her past as Natchios. Murdock stays behind in an attempt to reconnect with Elektra as the building drops on them.

Kingpin's return 

Murdock washes into the New York sewer system, being found by a taxi driver and  delivered to Father Paul Lantom, who entrusts Murdock with the care of Grace. As he slowly recovers, Murdock has a crisis of faith and decides to continue as Daredevil. After Fisk manipulates the FBI to release him from prison, Murdock investigates the Presidential Hotel, but begins to hallucinate him as a "devil on his shoulder". Murdock interrogates Fisk's lawyer Benjamin Donovan and learns of the situation with Vanessa Marianna. However, Fisk has already deduced that Murdock is Daredevil and sets an ambush at the jail Murdock visits for information, setting the FBI on his civilian identity, and using an unhinged Benjamin Poindexter as a fake Daredevil to discredit his vigilante identity.

Murdock resolves to kill Fisk to relieve New York and the FBI from his grasp, but hearing that Page is to be assassinated diverts him to save her, with Lantom dying in the crossfire. His last-ditch legal effort with lead Agent Ray Nadeem testifying fails when the jury is found compromised and Nadeem is executed by Poindexter. With few leads remaining, he discovers Fisk's fixer Felix Manning, who gives him enough information to turn Poindexter against Fisk and implicate Mariana's involvement in Nadeem's death. Murdock sets a rabid Poindexter to crash Fisk's wedding with Fisk paralyzing Poindexter and Murdock nearly killing him. Fisk agrees to return to prison and leave Page and Nelson alone if Murdock does not expose Marianna. With Fisk arrested using Nadeem's dying declaration, Murdock begins redeveloping his relationship with Nelson and Page, and begin a new law firm together.

Helping Peter Parker 
 
In 2024, after Quentin Beck frames Peter Parker for his murder and reveals his identity to the world, Parker and his aunt May hire Murdock as a personal attorney. Murdock succeeds in getting all charges against Parker dropped, but warns him that it would not cause a shift in public opinion on Spider-Man. He also advises Parker's associate Happy Hogan to secure legal protection due to an ongoing federal investigation into the Stark Industries technology involved during the battle in London between Beck and Parker. Months later, Murdock represents Hogan in court.

Dating Jennifer Walters 

In 2025, Murdock receives a recolored Daredevil suit by tailor Luke Jacobson from Los Angeles, and defends him weeks later against Jennifer Walters in a product liability suit brought about by her client, Eugene Patilio. After court, Murdock meets with Walters at a bar. He advises her that she is in a special position to help others; as an attorney, she can offer legal recourse for those in need, and she can take action as She-Hulk when the law fails, the two mutually expressing attraction for one another. He later pursues Patillo as Daredevil, Patillo having kidnapped Jacobson. Walters arrives as She-Hulk and the pair fight until Daredevil explains the situation. They then join forces and defeat Patillo and his goons and free Jacobson. That night, they sleep together, and Murdock returns to Hell's Kitchen the next morning. He later returns to Los Angeles for a weeklong stay and begins dating Walters, meeting her family, including Bruce Banner and his son Skaar, at a barbecue.

Reception

Critical response 
Brian Lowry of Variety praised Cox's portrayal of the character, while Mike Hale, writing for The New York Times, called Cox's performance as "divided", praising him as Murdock but criticizing him as Daredevil. IndieWire Liz Shannon Miller, reviewing season one, praised the performances of the cast, especially D'Onofrio, Curtis-Hall, and Cox.

Accolades

See also 
 Characters of the Marvel Cinematic Universe
 List of Daredevil characters
 List of The Defenders characters

Notes

References

External links 
 Matt Murdock on Marvel.com
 Matt Murdock on the Marvel Cinematic Universe Wiki
 

American male characters in television
Daredevil (Marvel Comics) characters
Daredevil (TV series)
Fictional American lawyers
Fictional blind characters
Fictional boxers
Fictional characters from Manhattan
Fictional characters with superhuman senses
Fictional Christians
Fictional defense attorneys
Fictional judoka
Fictional jujutsuka
Fictional karateka
Fictional lawyers
Fictional ninja
Fictional stick-fighters
Fictional torturers and interrogators
Fictional vigilantes
Male characters in film
Male characters in television
Martial artist characters in television
Marvel Cinematic Universe characters
Marvel Comics American superheroes
Marvel Comics martial artists
Superhero film characters
Superhero television characters
Superheroes with alter egos
Television characters introduced in 2015